Maurice S. Mazel Born January 12, 1895, was a prominent Chicago heart surgeon who founded Edgewater Hospital. Edgewater Hospital was a major medical center in Chicago for many decades, until it closed in December 2001 after substantial Medicare and Medicaid fraud blacklisted it from receiving further business from Federal or State medical programs.

Edgewater Hospital was the birthplace of Hillary Clinton and John Wayne Gacy.

References

Year of birth missing
American surgeons